Egor Mazantsev (also Egor Masanzev; 1897 Petserimaa – ?) was an Estonian politician. He was a member of V Riigikogu. He was a member of the Riigikogu since 24 March 1936. He replaced Aleksei Gretshanov.

References

1897 births
Members of the Riigikogu, 1932–1934
Year of death missing